Dodds may refer to:

Dodds (surname), people with the surname Dodds
Dodds Range, a former name of the Xueshan Range on Taiwan Island
Dodds, Iowa, a ghost town
Dodds, Missouri, an unincorporated community
Dodds, Ohio, a US unincorporated place
Dodds Township, Jefferson County, Illinois, US
Department of Defense Dependents Schools (DoDDS)
Isaac Dodds and Son, a UK railway engine manufacturer

See also
Dods (disambiguation)
Dod (disambiguation)
Dodd (disambiguation)